The 2011 WNBA season is the 15th season for the New York Liberty of the Women's National Basketball Association. The Liberty played at Prudential Center in New Jersey from 2011 through 2013 during renovations at Madison Square Garden.

Transactions

WNBA Draft
The following are the Liberty's selections in the 2011 WNBA Draft.

Transaction log
 March 14: The Liberty re-signed Sidney Spencer.
 April 6: The Liberty signed Ewelina Kobryn to a training camp contract.
 April 11: The Liberty traded draft rights to Angel Robinson and a second-round pick in the 2012 Draft to the Minnesota Lynx in exchange for draft rights to Jessica Breland.
 April 11: The Liberty traded Kalana Greene to the Connecticut Sun in exchange for draft rights to Sydney Colson.
 May 16: The Liberty signed Whitney Boddie and Crystal Kelly to training camp contracts.
 May 27: The Liberty acquired Quanitra Hollingsworth from the Minnesota Lynx in exchange for the right to swap third-round picks in the 2012 Draft.
 June 1: The Liberty waived Mekia Valentine, Whitney Boddie, Crystal Kelly, and Ewelina Kobryn.
 July 4: The Liberty waived Jessica Breland and signed Felicia Chester.
 July 21: The Liberty waived Felicia Chester.
 July 28: The Liberty signed Ta'Shia Phillips.
 August 4: The Liberty traded Sidney Spencer to the Phoenix Mercury in exchange for Kara Braxton.

Trades

Personnel changes

Additions

Subtractions

Roster

Depth

Season standings

Schedule

Preseason

|- align="center" bgcolor="ffbbbb"
| 1 || May 25 || 10:30am || Washington || 57–60 || Vaughn (10) || Powell (5) || Powell (4) || Prudential Center  6,472 || 0–1
|- align="center" bgcolor="bbffbb"
| 2 || May 27 || 7:00pm || China || 79–65 || N/A || N/A || N/A || Times Union Center  N/A || 1–1
|-

Regular season

|- align="center" bgcolor="bbffbb"
| 1 || June 5 || 3:00pm || @ Atlanta || SSO || 94–88 (OT) || Pierson (25) || Pierson (10) || Pondexter (11) || Philips Arena  8,038 || 1–0
|- align="center" bgcolor="bbffbb"
| 2 || June 10 || 7:00pm || @ Indiana ||  || 81–80 || Pondexter (21) || Vaughn (9) || Powell (4) || Conseco Fieldhouse  7,703 || 2–0
|- align="center" bgcolor="ffbbbb"
| 3 || June 11 || 7:00pm || Indiana || MSG || 80–86 || Carson (23) || Pierson (6) || Powell (5) || Prudential Center  7,835 || 2–1
|- align="center" bgcolor="ffbbbb"
| 4 || June 14 || 7:00pm || Atlanta ||  || 58–79 || Carson (21) || Carson (8) || Powell (2) || Prudential Center  5,725 || 2–2
|- align="center" bgcolor="ffbbbb"
| 5 || June 17 || 8:30pm || @ Chicago || CN100 || 73–85 || Pondexter (20) || Pondexter (8) || Carson (5) || Allstate Arena  5,718 || 2–3
|- align="center" bgcolor="ffbbbb"
| 6 || June 21 || 10:00pm || @ Los Angeles || ESPN2 || 91–96 || Pondexter (22) || Vaughn (12) || PondexterPowell (6) || Staples Center  10,389 || 2–4
|- align="center" bgcolor="bbffbb"
| 7 || June 23 || 12:30pm || @ Tulsa ||  || 94–82 || Vaughn (24) || Vaughn (12) || Pondexter (10) || BOK Center  4,682 || 3–4
|- align="center" bgcolor="bbffbb"
| 8 || June 26 || 4:00pm || Los Angeles ||  || 77–67 || Pondexter (22) || Vaughn (8) || Pondexter (5) || Prudential Center  7,625 || 4–4
|- align="center" bgcolor="ffbbbb"
| 9 || June 30 || 7:30pm || @ Atlanta || SSO || 81–87 || Pondexter (24) || PiersonVaughn (7) || Pondexter (6) || Philips Arena  4,423 || 4–5
|-

|- align="center" bgcolor="bbffbb"
| 10 || July 1 || 7:00pm || San Antonio || NBATV || 81–75 || Pondexter (19) || HollingsworthVaughn (7) || Pondexter (5) || Prudential Center  6,714 || 5–5
|- align="center" bgcolor="bbffbb"
| 11 || July 8 || 8:00pm || @ San Antonio || NBATV || 76–73 || Pondexter (20) || Pierson (10) || Pondexter (7) || AT&T Center  8,100 || 6–5
|- align="center" bgcolor="bbffbb"
| 12 || July 10 || 4:00pm || Chicago || NBATVMSG+CN100 || 80–73 || CarsonPondexter (18) || Powell (8) || PondexterPowell (4) || Prudential Center  7,315 || 7–5
|- align="center" bgcolor="bbffbb"
| 13 || July 13 || 12:00pm || Atlanta ||  || 91–69 || Powell (20) || Powell (7) || CarsonMitchellPondexter (5) || Prudential Center  14,314 || 8–5
|- align="center" bgcolor="ffbbbb"
| 14 || July 15 || 7:00pm || Connecticut || NBATVCSN-NE || 59–68 || Vaughn (15) || Vaughn (9) || Mitchell (4) || Prudential Center  7,722 || 8–6
|- align="center" bgcolor="bbffbb"
| 15 || July 17 || 4:00pm || Tulsa || NBATVMSG+ || 88–57 || Pondexter (18) || Vaughn (8) || MitchellPondexterPowell (3) || Prudential Center  6,735 || 9–6
|- align="center" bgcolor="ffbbbb"
| 16 || July 19 || 7:30pm || @ Connecticut ||  || 79–85 || Pierson (18) || Powell (11) || Pondexter (10) || Mohegan Sun Arena  6,096 || 9–7
|-
| colspan="11" align="center" valign="middle" | All-Star break
|- align="center" bgcolor="bbffbb"
| 17 || July 28 || 7:00pm || Washington || MSG || 75–71 || Pondexter (19) || Hollingsworth (7) || PiersonPondexter (4) || Prudential Center  6,808 || 10–7
|- align="center" bgcolor="ffbbbb"
| 18 || July 30 || 7:00pm || Phoenix || NBATVMSG+ || 84–91 || Powell (16) || Vaughn (10) || Vaughn (4) || Prudential Center  7,214 || 10–8
|-

|- align="center" bgcolor="bbffbb"
| 19 || August 2 || 7:30pm || @ Atlanta || FS-S || 85–75 || Pierson (20) || Pierson (8) || Mitchell (6) || Philips Arena  4,573 || 11–8
|- align="center" bgcolor="bbffbb"
| 20 || August 4 || 12:00pm || Chicago || NBATVMSG || 59–49 || Pondexter (15) || Powell (10) || CarsonPondexter (3) || Prudential Center  10,133 || 12–8
|- align="center" bgcolor="ffbbbb"
| 21 || August 6 || 7:00pm || @ Washington || NBATV || 81–91 || Pondexter (21) || Hollingsworth (7) || Pondexter (7) || Verizon Center  10,741 || 12–9
|- align="center" bgcolor="bbffbb"
| 22 || August 9 || 8:00pm || Seattle || ESPN2 || 58–56 || Pondexter (19) || Pierson (8) || Pondexter (5) || Prudential Center  6,732 || 13–9
|- align="center" bgcolor="ffbbbb"
| 23 || August 12 || 7:00pm || @ Washington ||  || 63–64 || Mitchell (18) || Hollingsworth (8) || Mitchell (6) || Verizon Center  10,092 || 13–10
|- align="center" bgcolor="ffbbbb"
| 24 || August 13 || 7:00pm || @ Indiana || NBATV || 71–82 || Pondexter (30) || Pondexter (8) || Pondexter (5) || Conseco Fieldhouse  9,237 || 13–11
|- align="center" bgcolor="bbffbb"
| 25 || August 16 || 7:00pm || Washington ||  || 69–66 || Pondexter (26) || Vaughn (7) || Powell (5) || Prudential Center  6,223 || 14–11
|- align="center" bgcolor="bbffbb"
| 26 || August 18 || 7:00pm || Connecticut || NBATVMSG || 84–81 (OT) || Pondexter (27) || Vaughn (11) || Pondexter (4) || Prudential Center  7,245 || 15–11
|- align="center" bgcolor="ffbbbb"
| 27 || August 20 || 10:00pm || @ Seattle ||  || 62–63 || Pierson (15) || Pondexter (6) || Pondexter (6) || KeyArena  7,139 || 15–12
|- align="center" bgcolor="bbffbb"
| 28 || August 23 || 10:00pm || @ Phoenix || ESPN2 || 74–70 || Pondexter (25) || Pondexter (8) || Pierson (5) || US Airways Center  8,871 || 16–12
|- align="center" bgcolor="ffbbbb"
| 29 || August 28 || 6:00pm || @ Chicago || NBATVCN100 || 73–74 || Pierson (19) || Vaughn (8) || Pondexter (8) || Allstate Arena  5,707 || 16–13
|- align="center" bgcolor="bbffbb"
| 30 || August 30 || 7:00pm || Chicago || MSG+CN100 || 71–67 || Pondexter (19) || Pierson (8) || PondexterPowell (3) || Prudential Center  6,334 || 17–13
|-

|- align="center" bgcolor="bbffbb"
| 31 || September 2 || 8:00pm || @ Minnesota ||  || 78–62 || Mitchell (24) || Hollingsworth (9) || Pondexter (7) || Target Center  8,929 || 18–13
|- align="center" bgcolor="ffbbbb"
| 32 || September 4 || 4:00pm || Minnesota ||  || 68–86 || Pierson (17) || Pierson (8) || Pondexter (7) || Prudential Center  8,247 || 18–14
|- align="center" bgcolor="bbffbb"
| 33 || September 9 || 7:00pm || Indiana || NBATVMSG+ || 83–75 || Carson (18) || Vaughn (9) || Vaughn (5) || Prudential Center  8,015 || 19–14
|- align="center" bgcolor="ffbbbb"
| 34 || September 11 || 1:00pm || @ Connecticut || NBATV || 63–69 || Powell (14) || PondexterVaughn (9) || Pondexter (5) || Mohegan Sun Arena  9,115 || 19–15
|-

| All games are viewable on WNBA LiveAccess or ESPN3.com

Postseason

|- align="center" bgcolor="ffbbbb"
| 1 || September 15 || 8:00pm || @ Indiana || ESPN2 || 72–74 || Pondexter (18) || Powell (8) || Pondexter (6) || Conseco Fieldhouse  7,608 || 0–1
|- align="center" bgcolor="bbffbb"
| 2 || September 17 || 4:00pm || Indiana || NBATVMSG || 87-72 || Powell (19) || PondexterPowellVaughn (5) || Pondexter (5) || Prudential Center  8,508 || 1–1
|- align="center" bgcolor="ffbbbb"
| 3 || September 19 || 8:00pm || @ Indiana || ESPN2 || 62-72 || Powell (19) || Vaughn (7) || Pondexter (5) || Conseco Fieldhouse  7,368 || 1–2
|-

Statistics

Regular season

Postseason

Awards and honors
 Cappie Pondexter was named WNBA Eastern Conference Player of the Week for the week of June 20, 2011.
 Cappie Pondexter was named WNBA Eastern Conference Player of the Week for the week of July 4, 2011.
 Essence Carson was named to the 2011 WNBA All-Star Team as a reserve.
 Cappie Pondexter was named to the 2011 WNBA All-Star Team as a starter.
 Kia Vaughn was named the Most Improved Player.
 Cappie Pondexter was named to the All-WNBA Second Team.

References

External links

New York Liberty seasons
New York
New York Liberty